Everlasting pea may refer to three perennial plants of the genus Lathyrus:
Lathyrus latifolius, the broad-leaved everlasting pea
Lathyrus rotundifolius, the Persian everlasting pea
Lathyrus grandiflorus, the two-flowered everlasting pea